Pyotr Adolfovich Otsup (– 23 January 1963), was a Soviet photojournalist. He photographed many historic events including the Russo-Japanese War, 1905 Russian Revolution, October Revolution in 1917, World War I and Russian Civil War. Otsup made nearly 40,000 photographs.

Life and work

Otsup was born in 1883 in Saint Petersburg, Russian Empire. He became interested in photography at the photo saloon, where he was studying during the 1890s. His career started as he was a photojournalist during the Russo-Japanese War. Beginning in 1900 he worked as a photographer for the magazine Ogoniok.

Otsup made portraits of Russian artists who worked before the revolution, including Leo Tolstoy, Sergei Rachmaninoff, Feodor Chaliapin and others; portraits of revolutionary politicians and leaders of the USSR, among which 35 portraits are of Vladimir Lenin, which were made between 1918 and 1922, and also portraits of Semyon Budyonny, Mikhail Frunze, Kliment Voroshylov, Clara Zetkin, Mikhail Kalinin, Joseph Stalin, Nikita Khrushchev, Yakov Sverdlov, Sergei Kirov, Vyacheslav Molotov, Valerian Kuybyshev. From the pictures taken by Otsup the bas-relief was made for the Order of Lenin and the images of Lenin were used on rouble banknotes.

Otsup was the only photojournalist that took pictures of the Second Congress of Soviets. From 1918 to 1921, during the Russian Civil War, he was taking pictures at battlefronts. From 1918 to 1935 he was the Kremlin's photographer. From 1919 to 1925 he was working in the Russian Central Executive Committee. From 1925 to 1935 he was responsible for the photography studio Russian Central council of labor unions.

On May 5, 1962 Otsup was awarded the Order of Lenin.

He died in 1963 in Moscow, Soviet Union.

Publications
Антология советской фотографии / Antologiâ sovetskoï fotografii. = Anthology of Soviet Photography. Vol. 1, 1917-1940; Vol. 2, 1941-1945. Moscow: Izdatelstvo Planeta. . In Russian.
Prostranstvo Revoliutsii: Rossiia. 1917-1941 = Field of the Revolution: Russia. 1917-1941. Moscow: Moscow Museum of Modern Art, 2007. . In English and Russian.

Collections
Otsup's work is held in the following public collection:
Metropolitan Museum of Art, New York City: 3 prints (as of August 2018)

References

External links

Petr Adolfovich Otsup (00.00.1883 — 00.00.1963)
Petr Adolfovich Otsup
The space of revolution: Russia. 1917—1941. The exhibition of Petr Otsup

1883 births
1963 deaths
Photographers from Saint Petersburg
Soviet military personnel of World War II
Soviet photographers
Russian photojournalists
War photographers